Campofelice may refer to:

 Campofelice di Fitalia, a municipality in the Metropolitan City of Palermo in the Italian region Sicily, Italy
 Campofelice di Roccella, a municipality in the Metropolitan City of Palermo in the Italian region of Sicily, Italy

See also 
 Campo Felice, a karstic plateau in the central Apennines, Italy